The Uruguay women's national under-20 football team representing Uruguay in international women's football at the age of under-20. The team competes South American U-20 Women's Championship. Uruguay has never qualified for a FIFA U-20 Women's World Cup.

Team image

Nicknames
The Uruguay women's national under-20 football team has been known or nicknamed as the Las Celestes, Charrúas.

Home stadium
Uruguay plays their home matches on the Estadio Centenario and others stadiums.

History
The Uruguay womens national under-20 football team have played its debut game against Paraguay on 11 May 2004 at Encarnación, Paraguay which won by 5–1 goals. The teams has finished Third-Place in the 2022 South American Under-20 Women's Football Championship. They nations has not yet qualified into the FIFA U-20 Women's World Cup.

Current squad
The following players were list for 2022 South American Under-20 Women's Football Championship on 18 March 2022.

Fixtures and results
Legend

2020

2022

Competitive records
 Champions   Runners-up   Third place   Fourth place

FIFA U-20 Women's World Cup

South American Under-20 Women's Football Championship

References

South American women's national association football teams
Women's football in Uruguay